Boris Arkadevich Davidyan (April 28, 1949 – July 20, 2020), better known as Boka, was an Armenian singer and songwriter, a well-known performer of "prison-style songs". He was born in Soviet Azerbaijan to an Armenian family.

Biography
Boris Davidyan was born on April 28, 1949 to an Armenian family in Baku. His father Arkady Vartanovich was a war veteran who worked as a foreman at a factory. Boka lost his mother very early.

Since childhood he was interested in music. He graduated from a music school, then studied and received a diploma from the Tashkent Automobile and Road Institute.

In 1972, he recorded his first music album in Yerevan. During the Soviet years, he became a very popular soloist with Armenian rabiz, Caucasian, and Russian chanson lovers. In his albums, most of the songs are his own creation, although he also sang compositions by Vladimir Vysotsky and Arkady Severny. He performed his songs with a special oriental flavor. Some sources call him a "classic of chanson".

In 1988, he visited United States and recorded there his new and popular album, "The Thieves' Share". The main composition of this album became a hit and was subsequently performed by many of his fellow soloists.

He was forced to leave Baku due to ethnic violence against Armenians there in December 1989. At the beginning of 1996 he lived in Yerevan. He then moved to Los Angeles.

He died on July 20, 2020 in Los Angeles after a long illness of the lungs. He had a son, two daughters and five grandchildren.

Achievements and awards
 "Chanson of the Year 2006" for the song "Youth".
 "Chanson of the Year 2007" for the song "My Soul".

Discography
First Concert (1972)
Second Concert (1973)
Third Concert (1974)
Fourth Concert in Baku (1979)
Fifth Concert "Back in Tbilisi" (1981)
Sixth Concert (1982)
The Thieves' Share (1988)
Nostalgia (1993)
Memory (1995)
Hello from America (1996)
For All Friends (1997)
Mom, I'm your son... (2002)
My Father (2003)
My Share (2007)
My City (2008)
The Price of Life (2011)
To Live and Love (2016)

References

20th-century Armenian male singers
Soviet male singers
1949 births
2020 deaths
Musicians from Baku
Soviet Armenians
20th-century Azerbaijani male singers
Russian chanson
Armenian emigrants to the United States
21st-century Armenian male singers